The Calvert Historic District is a historic district which comprises  roughly bounded by Main, Garritt, Pin Oak, Maple, and Barton streets in Calvert, Texas. Contributing properties in the district consist of 82 buildings, one site and two other structures. On April 3, 1978, the district was added to the National Register of Historic Places.

Photo gallery

See also

National Register of Historic Places listings in Robertson County, Texas
Recorded Texas Historic Landmarks in Robertson County

References

External links

Geography of Robertson County, Texas
Queen Anne architecture in Texas
Colonial Revival architecture in Texas
Historic districts on the National Register of Historic Places in Texas
National Register of Historic Places in Robertson County, Texas